Dactylispa feae, is a species of leaf beetle found in India, China, Sri Lanka, Indonesia, Myanmar, Sumatra and Vietnam.

References 

Cassidinae
Insects of Sri Lanka
Beetles described in 1888